Coptotriche africana is a moth of the  family Tischeriidae that is found in Namibia and South Africa.

The larvae feed on Rhus guenzii, Rhus lancea and Rhus pyroides. They mine the leaves of their host plant.

References

Moths described in 2003
Tischeriidae
Moths of Africa
Insects of Namibia